The 2003 All-Ireland Intermediate Hurling Championship was the 20th staging of the All-Ireland hurling championship. The championship ended on 30 August 2003.

Galway were the defending champions, however, they were defeated in the All-Ireland semi-final. Cork won the title after defeating Kilkenny by 1–21 to 0–23 in the final.

References

Intermediate
All-Ireland Intermediate Hurling Championship